You're Different and That's Super is the name of a children's book by Queer Eye for the Straight Guy fashion expert Carson Kressley, published in October 2005 by Simon and Schuster. The pictures were by Jared D. Lee.

Synopsis 
Carson Kressley tells the story of a one-of-a-kind pony who learns that it's our differences that make us "super."  Whimsical black-and-white illustrations from renowned equine artist Jared Lee corral humor and charm in a tale of a unicorn struggling to find his identity and place in the world.

See also
Queer Eye for the Straight Guy

References

External links
Website for the book

American picture books
2005 children's books
Fiction about unicorns